Steven Michael Kahn (born 1954) is an American physicist currently the Cassius Lamb Kirk Professor at Stanford University and formerly the I. I. Rabi Professor of Physics at Columbia University and is an Elected Fellow of the American Academy of Arts and Sciences and American Physical Society.

Kahn graduated summa cum laude from Columbia College in 1975, and received a PhD in physics from University of California, Berkeley in 1980. He was a post-doctoral fellow at the Center for Astrophysics  Harvard & Smithsonian from 1980 to 1982.

Honors 
Asteroid 179413 Stevekahn, discovered by astronomers with the Sloan Digital Sky Survey in 2001, was named in his honor. The official  was published by IAU's WGSBN on 7 February 2022.

References
 

Fellows of the American Physical Society
Stanford University faculty
Living people
21st-century American physicists
University of California, Berkeley alumni
1954 births
Columbia College (New York) alumni
Columbia University faculty